The Experts is a 1973 West German drama film directed by Norbert Kückelmann. It was entered into the 23rd Berlin International Film Festival where it won the Silver Bear award.

Cast
 Mathias Eysen as Matthias Mainzer
 Eckhard Langmann as Amtsarzt
 Wolfgang Ebert as Gutachter
 Ernst Battenberg as Anstaltsdirektor
 Gisela Fischer
 Roland Wiegenstein
 Miriam Mahler
 Hans Brenner
  (as Alo Edel)
 Anna Czaschke

References

External links

1973 films
1973 drama films
1973 directorial debut films
West German films
1970s German-language films
German drama films
Films directed by Norbert Kückelmann
Films about psychiatry
Films about miscarriage of justice
1970s German films